The 1951 Women's European Volleyball Championship was the third edition of the event, organised by Europe's governing volleyball body, the Confédération Européenne de Volleyball. It was hosted in Paris, France from 15 to 22 September 1951.

Participating teams

Format
The tournament was played in two different stages. In the first stage, the six participants were divided into two groups of three teams. The winners and runners-up of each group advanced to a second stage of a single group containing four teams. All groups in both stages played a single round-robin format.

Pools composition

Preliminary round

Pool 1

|}

|}

Pool 2

|}

|}

Final round

|}

|}

Final ranking

References
 Confédération Européenne de Volleyball (CEV)

External links
 Results at todor66.com

European Volleyball Championships
Volleyball Championship
V
Volleyball in Paris
Women's European Volleyball Championships
Women's European Volleyball Championship
Women's volleyball in France
Women's European Volleyball Championship
International sports competitions hosted by Paris